Ultimate Tornado is a documentary that first aired on the National Geographic Channel on April 12, 2006. It focuses on several unusually violent tornado events that have occurred in the United States, which include the 2004 Attica, Kansas tornado outbreak (Attica F2 and Harper F4), the 1995 Pampa, Texas tornado (F4), the Jarrell tornado (F5), and the 1999 Bridge Creek tornado (F5). 

It last examined the possible effects of a theoretical F5 tornado hitting downtown Dallas, Texas, postulating that this would be the worst tornado in history in terms of cost, damage, destruction and loss of life. 

2006 in the environment
National Geographic (American TV channel) original programming
Documentary films about disasters
Tornado